L. Bruce Richmond (October 17, 1920 – April 13, 2008) was an American businessman and politician.

Richmond was born in Johnston City, Illinois. He served in the United States Navy during World War II. Richmond studied at Southern Illinois University. He lived in Murphysboro, Illinois and he was the owner of the Aircraft Sign Service in Murphysboro, Illinois. Richmond served on the Murphysboro City Council and as mayor of Murpheysboro. Richmond served in the Illinois House of Representatives from 1975 until 1993 and was a Democrat. Richmond died at his home in Murphysboro, Illinois.

Notes

External links

1920 births
2008 deaths
People from Williamson County, Illinois
People from Murphysboro, Illinois
Military personnel from Illinois
Southern Illinois University alumni
Illinois city council members
Mayors of places in Illinois
Democratic Party members of the Illinois House of Representatives
20th-century American politicians
United States Navy personnel of World War II